Francesco Monaco (5 August 1898, Agira - 9 February 1986, Catania) was an Italian Roman Catholic bishop.

He was ordained priest on 15 February 1925. Pope Pius XII appointed him titular bishop of Germensis in Galatia and coadjutor bishop of Caltanissetta on 12 December 1953 and he was consecrated by bishop Clemente Gaddi on 24 February the following year. He laid down both posts when he was made bishop of Caltanissetta in 1956, a role he then held until his retirement in 1973.

References

Bishops of Caltanissetta
1898 births
1986 deaths
Religious leaders from the Province of Enna
20th-century Italian Roman Catholic bishops